In enzymology, an alanine-oxomalonate transaminase is an enzyme that catalyzes the chemical reaction

L-alanine + oxomalonate  pyruvate + aminomalonate

Thus, the two substrates of this enzyme are L-alanine and oxomalonate, whereas its two products are pyruvate and aminomalonate.

This enzyme belongs to the family of transferases, specifically the transaminases, which transfer nitrogenous groups.  The systematic name of this enzyme class is L-alanine:oxomalonate aminotransferase. Other names in common use include alanine-oxomalonate aminotransferase, L-alanine-ketomalonate transaminase, and alanine-ketomalonate (mesoxalate) transaminase.  It employs one cofactor, pyridoxal phosphate.

References

 

EC 2.6.1
Pyridoxal phosphate enzymes
Enzymes of unknown structure